The Velvet Underground is a 2021 American documentary film directed and produced by Todd Haynes that chronicles the life and times of the rock band the Velvet Underground.

It had its world premiere at the Cannes Film Festival on July 7, 2021. It was released on October 15, 2021, by Apple TV+, to critical acclaim.

Synopsis
The Velvet Underground was an influential band that arose from the music, art, and film avant-gardes of early-1960s New York City. Although not a commercial success at the time, it had a significant impact on underground, experimental, and alternative music and the development of punk and new wave music. Its core members were Lou Reed, Sterling Morrison, John Cale, Doug Yule and Maureen Tucker. Artist Andy Warhol managed and promoted the bandconvincing them to add German singer and model Nico to their line-up. Haynes's film examines the cultural milieu of the band and its musical and cinematic influences. It tracks the band's history from formation to the break-up of its original line-up in the early 1970s. Interviews with surviving band members Cale and Tucker and musicians the band influenced are woven with archival music and film material.

Production
In August 2017, Todd Haynes was hired to direct and produce a documentary film about the Velvet Underground. Haynes received cooperation of the surviving members of the band including founding members John Cale and Maureen Tucker. Interviews for the film were shot in 2018. Doug Yule, who replaced Cale in the band in 1968, appears in voiceover but was not filmed.

Release
In October 2020, Apple TV+ acquired distribution rights to the film. It had its world premiere at the Cannes Film Festival on July 7, 2021. It was released theatrically and on Apple TV+ on October 15, 2021., and in December 2022 it was released on DVD and Blu-ray by The Criterion Collection.

Reception

Critical reception
On Rotten Tomatoes, the film has an approval rating of 98% based on 127 reviews, with an average rating of 8.10/10. The critical consensus states: "The Velvet Underground takes a fittingly idiosyncratic approach to delivering a rock documentary that captures the band as well as its era." On Metacritic, the film has a weighted score of 87 out of 100 based on 31 critics, indicating "universal acclaim".

Some critics felt the documentary glossed over the band's 1969 self-titled album and contributions by Yule.

Accolades

References

External links
 

2021 films
2021 documentary films
American documentary films
American rock music films
Apple TV+ original films
Documentary films about musical groups
Documentary films about rock music and musicians
Films directed by Todd Haynes
Films produced by Christine Vachon
Killer Films films
PolyGram Filmed Entertainment films
The Velvet Underground
2020s English-language films
2020s American films